Have You Seen Tom Thumb? is a biography of General Tom Thumb written for children by Mabel Leigh Hunt. It tells the story of Charles Sherwood Stratton, a charming and humorous dwarf who traveled all over the world with the showman P. T. Barnum. The book, illustrated by Fritz Eichenberg, was first published in 1942 and was a Newbery Honor recipient in 1943.

References

1942 children's books
Children's non-fiction books
American children's books
American biographies
Newbery Honor-winning works
J. B. Lippincott & Co. books